

See also 
Loitering